The  San Antonio Force season was the first and only season. The Force finished 2–8 and failed to qualify for the playoffs. The Force's 0–50 loss in Week 3 to the Orlando Predators was the only shutout in the Arena Football League's 32-season history.

Regular season

Schedule

Standings

z – clinched homefield advantage

y – clinched division title

x – clinched playoff spot

Roster

References

External links
San Antonio Force on ArenaFan.com

1992 Arena Football League season
1992 in sports in Texas